Wellworthy Athletic were a works football team based in the New Forest area of Hampshire. The club existed for over 60 years until the loss of their ground in 1988.

History
Wellworthy Athletic FC were founded in 1927 as the works side of Wellworthy Engineering (manufacturers of automotive and aerospace components). They initially played in the Bournemouth League where they climbed up through the ranks to win promotion to the Hampshire League Division 2 in 1932. Initially, they did well, finishing runners-up in 1932–33 but were relegated after finishing bottom in 1934–35.

After a spell playing in the New Forest League, Wellworthy returned to the Hampshire League in 1949 when they were placed in Division 3 West. Initially, the club again did well as they challenged for promotion twice finishing third and as runners-up in 1950–51. Throughout the decade Wellworthy remained a consistent mid-table side, with the main highlight coming when the side reached the Hampshire Intermediate Cup final in 1956–57. However, the early sixties saw a decline in fortunes and after two seasons of struggle, they were relegated in 1960–61 and returned to the Bournemouth League.

During 1971 Wellworthy welcomed an Ex-Pompey XI to christen their newly installed floodlights in a game that drew 600 spectators to watch the sharing of eight goals.

After many years of re-building, the eighties saw Wellworthy Athletic once again emerge as a strong force. The 1984–85 season was a memorable one as they completed a fantastic double by winning the Bournemouth League and the Pickford Cup, as well as being finalists in the Hampshire Intermediate Cup. These successes were enough for Wellworthy to deservedly return to the Hampshire League Division 3 for the 1985–86 season where they promptly won promotion as runners-up.

For the 1986–87 season, the Wessex League was formed (mainly by the top and most ambitious Hampshire League clubs with the best facilities) and Wellworthy were surprisingly elected despite their Ampress Works Ground only meeting the basic requirements. Despite the big step up, they held their own and they did extremely well to finish in a very creditable 7th place.

In 1987–88 Wellworthy finished in 15th place, but enjoyed a fine run in the Hampshire Senior Cup when they reached the semi-finals. En route, they surprisingly defeated Waterlooville and Portsmouth Reserves both 2–0, before losing by the same score against eventual winners Gosport Borough. Sadly this was to be their last season.

The club suffered a major setback in 1988 when they lost their ground, at same the time league rivals and neighbours Lymington Town were struggling badly so the two clubs decided to join forces, becoming known as AFC Lymington playing at Lymington's Southampton Road home. The move proved to be an instant success as the new club soon proceeded to become a strong force in the Wessex League, winning several league titles and cups.

Honours
Hampshire League Division 2
Runners-up 1932/33
Hampshire League Division 3
Runners-up 1985/86
Hampshire League Division 3 West
Runners-up 1950/51
Bournemouth League Division 1
Champions 1984/85
Hampshire FA Intermediate Cup
Finalists 1956/57 and 1984/85
Bournemouth Senior Cup
Finalists 1953/54
Bournemouth Pickford Cup
Winners 1984/85
New Forest League
Champions 1948/49
New Forest League Perkins Charity Cup
Winners 1948/49 and 1949/50
Runners-up 1968/69

Records

League

Famous Players
The former Southampton 1976 FA Cup winner David Peach as player-manager and the Hampshire cricket wicket keeper Adrian Aymes both turned out for the club during their Wessex League days.

References

External links
Football Club History Database

Defunct football clubs in England
Association football clubs established in 1927
Association football clubs disestablished in 1988
1927 establishments in England
1988 disestablishments in England
Bournemouth Saturday League
Hampshire League
Wessex Football League
Works association football teams in England